William Theodore Alexander III (born August 13, 1960) is an American politician.

Early life 
On August 13, 1960, Alexander was born in Morganton, North Carolina.

Education 
Alexander earned a BA degree in Political Science from University of North Carolina at Charlotte. Alexander earned a MA degree in Historic Preservation from Cornell University.

Career 
Alexander is a Republican member of the North Carolina State Senate, representing the 44th district. Alexander has served previously as mayor of Shelby, North Carolina and as chair of the Cleveland County, North Carolina Republican Party.

References

External links

Living people
1960 births
People from Morganton, North Carolina
People from Shelby, North Carolina
University of North Carolina at Charlotte alumni
Cornell University alumni
Mayors of places in North Carolina
Republican Party North Carolina state senators
21st-century American politicians